Home entertainment refers to media, equipment, and methods used for delivery and enjoyment of various forms of entertainment in the home, and may refer to:

 Home audio
 Home cinema
 Home video 
 Magnetic tape
 Phonograph record
 Streaming media
 Video game
 Television
 Film

See also
 Home entertainment system (disambiguation)